is a Japanese bassist. He is a member of Japanese band , and is associated with multiple other Japanese acts including rock group ZUTOMAYO, jazz group DIMENSION, and vocaloid music producers DECO*27 and sasakure.UK.

Born in the city of Iwakuni, Yamaguchi Prefecture, Japan, Nikamoto studied at the  music school. Upon graduating, he taught bass there for a while. Nikamoto now plays as a session musician and touring musician, proficient in both electric bass and upright (acoustic) bass.

References 

Japanese bass guitarists
Musicians from Yamaguchi Prefecture
Living people
1986 births